Gloria E. Baquero Lleras is a Puerto Rican educator and university administrator. She was the Secretary of Education of Puerto Rico from January to June 2005. In 2011, Baquero Lleras was appointed president of National University College.

Early life and education 
Baquero Lleras was born to Fermina Lleras and Gilberto Baquerro. She is from Juana Díaz, Puerto Rico. She attended elementary school in Yauco and Benigno Fernández García middle school in Cayey. She graduated from Benjamin Harrison School. Baquero Lleras completed a B.A., M.A., and Ed.D. in administration and educational supervision at University of Puerto Rico.

Career 
Baquero Lleras was the principal of Berwind Superior School and Antonio Sarriera Egozcue School. In from 1990 to 1992, she was a special assistant to the Secretary of Education. She worked as an educational consultant from 1994 to 1996. She was a general manager at Lucy López Roig y Asociados from 1997 to 2005. She was the Secretary of Education of Puerto Rico from January to June 2005. She returned to Lucy López Roig y Asociados as president from July 2005 to February 2008. In 2011, she succeeded Carmen Z. Claudio as president of National University College.

Personal life 
Baquero Lleras is married to Juan E. Candelaria. They have three sons.

See also 

 List of women presidents or chancellors of co-ed colleges and universities

References 

Living people
Year of birth missing (living people)
People from Juana Díaz, Puerto Rico
Secretaries of Education of Puerto Rico
21st-century Puerto Rican educators
20th-century Puerto Rican educators
Women heads of universities and colleges
Presidents of the National University College
University of Puerto Rico alumni
Women school principals and headteachers
20th-century women educators
21st-century American women educators
21st-century American educators
20th-century American women